Joshua Oliver (born March 21, 1997) is an American football tight end for the Minnesota Vikings of the National Football League (NFL). He played college football at San Jose State.

Early years

Born in Templeton, California, Oliver attended Paso Robles High School in Paso Robles, California. Uncle, Clancy Oliver, was an NFL defensive back for the Pittsburgh Steelers from 1969 to 1970 and St. Louis Cardinals in 1973, and second cousin Darren Oliver was a Major League Baseball pitcher from 1993 to 2013. He played tight end, defensive end, and outside linebacker on the football team and forward on the basketball team in high school.

College career
Oliver played at San Jose State from 2015 to 2018. During his career he had 98 receptions for 1,067 yards and seven touchdowns.

Professional career

Jacksonville Jaguars
Oliver was drafted by the Jacksonville Jaguars in the third round, 69th overall, of the 2019 NFL Draft. He was placed on injured reserve on November 18, 2019.

Oliver had surgery on a broken bone in his foot and was placed on injured reserve again on August 20, 2020.

Baltimore Ravens
On March 18, 2021, Oliver was traded to the Baltimore Ravens in exchange for a conditional 2022 seventh-round selection.

In Week 3 of 2022 season against the New England Patriots, he caught his first career touchdown pass from a yard out from quarterback Lamar Jackson. He finished the game with two receptions for eight yards and the aforementioned touchdown in the 37–26 win.

Minnesota Vikings
On March 15, 2023, Oliver signed a three-year, $21 million contract with the Minnesota Vikings.

References

External links

Baltimore Ravens bio
San Jose State Spartans bio

1997 births
Living people
People from Paso Robles, California
Players of American football from California
American football tight ends
San Jose State Spartans football players
Jacksonville Jaguars players
Baltimore Ravens players
Minnesota Vikings players